Cesare Bovio (died 17 Jan 1583) was a Roman Catholic prelate who served as Bishop of Nardò (1577–1583).

Biography
On 15 April 1577, Cesare Bovio was appointed during the papacy of Pope Gregory XIII as Bishop of Nardò. He served as Bishop of Nardò until his death on 17 January 1583.

References

External links and additional sources
 (for Chronology of Bishops) 
(for Chronology of Bishops) 

16th-century Italian Roman Catholic bishops
1583 deaths
Bishops appointed by Pope Gregory XIII